The 1992 HTC Prague Open was a women's tennis tournament played on outdoor clay courts at the I. Czech Lawn Tennis Club in Prague in the former Czechoslovakia that was part of Tier V of the 1992 WTA Tour. It was the only edition of the  tournament with a prize money of $ 100.000, and it was held from 20 July until 26 July 1992. First-seeded Radka Zrubáková won the singles title.

Finals

Singles
 Radka Zrubáková defeated  Katerina Kroupova 6–3, 7–5
 It was Zrubáková's 1st singles title of the year and the 3rd of her career.

Doubles
 Karin Kschwendt /  Petra Ritter defeated  Eva Švíglerová /  Noëlle van Lottum 6–4, 2–6, 7–5
 It was Kschwendt's 1st doubles title of the year and the 3rd of her career. It was Ritter's only doubles title of her career.

See also
 BVV Prague Open
 I.ČLTK Prague Open

References

External links
 WTA tournament draws

1992 WTA Tour